Edward L. Jackson was an American football and basketball coach and administrator for several historically black colleges and universities in the Eastern United States. He served as the head football coach at Delaware State University, Johnson C. Smith University and Howard University, altering his tenures among the three schools over the course of 23 years. Not once during his football coaching career did a team of his finish with a sub-.500 record. Jackson also coached basketball at Johnson C. Smith and Delaware State.

Jackson received Bachelor of Science and Master of Education degrees from Springfield College in Springfield, Massachusetts. He earned a doctorate from the School of Physical Education at Pennsylvania State University in 1955. Jackson went to the Tuskegee Institute in 1956, serving as physical education director until 1968 and then as vice president of academic affairs. In 1970, he was recognized by the American Association for Health, Physical Education, and Recreation with a Presidential Citation.

Head coaching record

References 

Year of birth missing
Year of death missing
Delaware State Hornets football coaches
Delaware State Hornets men's basketball coaches
Howard Bison athletic directors
Howard Bison football coaches
Johnson C. Smith Golden Bulls basketball coaches
Johnson C. Smith Golden Bulls football coaches
Tuskegee Golden Tigers athletic directors
Pennsylvania State University alumni
Springfield College (Massachusetts) alumni
Sportspeople from Springfield, Massachusetts
African-American coaches of American football
African-American basketball coaches
African-American college athletic directors in the United States
20th-century African-American sportspeople